Eilema marwitziana is a moth of the  subfamily Arctiinae. It was described by Strand in 1912. It is found in Tanzania and possibly Kenya.

References

marwitziana
Moths described in 1912
Moths of Africa